Life as We Know It is the tenth studio album by American country music band Lonestar. It was released on June 4, 2013 via their own 4 Star Records label. It is Lonestar's first new studio album since the return of original lead vocalist Richie McDonald in 2011.

Critical reception
Matt Bjorke of Roughstock gave the album a positive review. He praised the album's production and the band's choice of songs, calling them "top-notch". He also called the album "one that gives the band's fans an exciting look into the new chapter in the band's career with their own label (4Star Records) and renewed energy towards crafting another 20 years in the business."

Track listing

Personnel 
Lonestar
 Richie McDonald – lead vocals
 Dean Sams – acoustic piano, Wurlitzer electric piano, Hammond B3 organ, acoustic guitars, backing vocals
 Michael Britt – electric guitars
 Keech Rainwater – drums

Additional musicians
 Troy Lancaster – electric guitars
 Adam Shoenfeld – electric guitars
 Pat McGrath – acoustic guitars
 Russ Pahl – steel guitar
 Tony Lucido – bass guitar
  Eric Darken – percussion
 Jonathan Yudkin – strings
 Perry Coleman – backing vocals

Production
 Rich Blaser – executive producer 
 Lonestar – producers
 Dean Sams – additional production, vocal engineer, digital editing
 Mills Logan – tracking engineer, mixing 
 Alex Jarvis – assistant engineer 
 Allen Parker – assistant engineer 
 Lowell Reynolds – assistant engineer 
 Brien Sagar – assistant engineer 
 Brady Barnett – digital editing 
 Glenn Sweitzer – art direction, design 
 Russ Harrington – photography 
 John Scarpati – photography

Chart performance

References

2013 albums
Lonestar albums